Caulastrocecis pudicellus is a moth of the family Gelechiidae. It is found in Spain, Slovenia, Croatia, Romania, as well as on the Greek islands and Crete.

References

Moths described in 1861
Caulastrocecis
Moths of Europe